Elizabeth Stewart, 2nd Countess of Moray suo jure (Late 1565 – 18 November 1591), was the daughter of James Stewart, 1st Earl of Moray and Agnes Keith.

She was born at St Andrews while her father was in exile in England following the Chaseabout Raid, a rebellion against Mary, Queen of Scots.

On 23 January 1581 she married James Stewart, son of James Stewart, 1st Lord Doune, and they had five children: The wedding was celebrated on 31 January in Fife with a tournament of "running at the ring" and James VI of Scotland took part. Two day after the party came to Leith, where a water pageant culminated with an assault on a pasteboard Papal Castel Sant'Angelo, built on boats on the water of Leith. Some of her father's friends relatives thought the Lord Doune's son was not of sufficient status to marry her. 

She died in childbirth in November 1591.

Family
Her children included:
 Grizel Stewart, married Robert Innes, 1st Baronet Innes, by whom she had issue.
 Margaret Stewart (1591 – 4 August 1639), married firstly as his second wife Charles Howard, 1st Earl of Nottingham, by whom she had issue; and secondly William Monson, Viscount Monson
 James Stewart, 3rd Earl of Moray (before 1591 – 6 August 1638), who married Lady Anne Gordon, by whom he had issue, including James Stewart, 4th Earl of Moray
 Elizabeth Stewart, married John Abernethy, 8th Lord Abernethy of Saltoun, son of Alexander Abernethy, 6th Lord Saltoun
 Francis Stewart, Knight of the Order of the Bath, who was well known in London literary society, and is said to have frequented the literary meetings at the Mermaid tavern

References

Moray, Elizabeth Stewart, 2nd Countess of
Earls of Moray
Moray, Elizabeth Stewart, 2nd Countess of
Year of birth unknown
16th-century Scottish peers
Moray
Moray
Deaths in childbirth